Never Have I Ever is an American comedy-drama television series starring Maitreyi Ramakrishnan, created by Mindy Kaling and Lang Fisher. Though it takes place in the San Fernando Valley, the show has been reported to be loosely based on Kaling's childhood experiences in the Boston area, while Kaling herself has said it is based "in the spirit of my childhood". It premiered on Netflix on April 27, 2020, and is about an Indian-American high school student dealing with the sudden death of her father. The series received generally favorable reviews.

The series has been described as a watershed moment for South Asian representation in Hollywood and has been praised for breaking Asian stereotypes. On July 1, 2020, Netflix renewed the series for a second season, which premiered on July 15, 2021. Netflix renewed the series for a third season on August 19, 2021, which was released on August 12, 2022, and consists of 10 episodes, and a fourth and final season will premiere in 2023.

Plot

The story centers around Devi Vishwakumar, a 15-year-old Indian-American Tamil girl from Sherman Oaks, Los Angeles. After her father, Mohan, dies suddenly, Devi loses the sensation in her legs. This happens due to the psychological trauma of the event and she is unable to walk for three months. However, one day she miraculously recovers and stands on her legs, in an attempt to see her crush Paxton Hall-Yoshida. After having a socially horrible freshman year, she wishes to change her social status, but friends, family, and feelings do not make it easy for her. Meanwhile, Devi's friend Eleanor deals with learning her absentee mother has been back in town for months with no contact, while Devi's other friend Fabiola struggles to come out as gay. Also, Devi's live-in cousin Kamala tries to hide her college boyfriend from her family, as her family expects her to wed Prashant, an Indian man she's never met, in an arranged marriage.

The following year, Devi tries to deal with her grief, her identity, and school life. At the same time, her relationship with her mother, Nalini, becomes strained. Devi also has to deal with her feelings for Paxton and Ben, after she cheats on both of them with each other. Adding to the mix is a new entrant in school, Aneesa Qureshi, whom Devi starts to feel jealous about and starts a rumor about, although she apologizes and they befriend each other. Devi also finds her mom with Dr. Jackson, and is upset that she moved on so quickly from the death of her dad. Paxton gets over Devi's betrayal and the two become romantically interested again. Meanwhile, Kamala experiences sexism at her job in STEM, while also becoming close to Prashant before starting to dislike him.

Paxton doesn't refer to Devi as his girlfriend, and publicly refuses her when she asks him to the dance, which makes Devi think that he is using her. They later talk, and Paxton says that they cannot date publicly because Devi cheated on him. Devi agrees to privately date him, but she later changes her mind and breaks up with him. Paxton realizes his mistake and goes to the dance with Devi, apologizing to her. The two begin to date publicly, but Devi starts to feel insecure due to others gossiping about them. And hooks up with Ben, When Paxton has a friendly reconciliation with a girl he wronged in the past, Devi's insecurity turns to jealousy, causing Paxton to break up with her.

Never Have I Ever is mostly narrated by professional tennis player John McEnroe for Devi, with the latter often showing flashes of McEnroe's legendary temper. Three of the episodes narrated by Andy Samberg for Ben, and another by Gigi Hadid for Paxton.

Cast and characters

Main
 Maitreyi Ramakrishnan as Devi Vishwakumar, initially a 15-year-old high school sophomore who wants to improve her life and harbours feelings for both Paxton Hall Yoshida and Ben Gross. (She is based on the show's creator, Mindy Kaling).
 Poorna Jagannathan as Dr. Nalini Vishwakumar, a dermatologist and Devi's mother with whom she has a mixed relationship.
 Richa Moorjani as Kamala Nandiwadal, Devi's cousin. She is staying with Devi's family while completing her PhD at Caltech.
 Darren Barnet as Paxton Hall-Yoshida, a popular 16-year-old high school junior and Devi's crush, later love interest.
 Jaren Lewison as Benjamin (Ben) Gross, also a high school sophomore. Initially Devi's nemesis at school, he becomes a good friend for whom she has complicated feelings.
 John McEnroe as himself, the narrator of the series and Mohan's idol.
 Ramona Young as Eleanor Wong, one of Devi's best friends who has a passion for acting and struggles with the fact her mother is absent (season 2–present; recurring season 1).
 Lee Rodriguez as Fabiola Torres, one of Devi's best friends who is on the robotics team and struggles with her sexuality (season 2–present; recurring season 1).

Recurring
 Megan Suri as Aneesa Qureshi, a new Indian student at Sherman Oaks and Devi's new acquaintance (season 2–present).
 Sendhil Ramamurthy as Mohan Vishwakumar, Devi's deceased father
 Niecy Nash as Dr. Jamie Ryan, Devi's therapist.
 Eddie Liu as Steve, Kamala's boyfriend (season 1).
 Christina Kartchner as Eve Hjelm, Fabiola's love interest (seasons 1-2; guest season 3).
 Alexandra Billings as Jennifer Warner, the college counselor (seasons 1–2).
 Benjamin Norris as Trent Harrison, Paxton's friend, and later Eleanor's boyfriend.
 Dino Petrera as Jonah Sharpe, a boy who comes out as gay.
 Jae Suh Park as Joyce Wong, Eleanor's absentee mom who is a bumbling actress (season 1).
 Adam Shapiro as Mr. Lyle Shapiro, a history teacher.
 Cocoa Brown as Principal Grubbs.
 Martin Martinez as Oliver Martinez, Eleanor's boyfriend in season 1.
 Jack Seavor McDonald as Eric Perkins, an unpopular student and member of the robotics team.
 Lily D. Moore as Rebecca Hall-Yoshida, Paxton's sister who is interested in fashion design.
 Rushi Kota as Prashant, Kamala's ex-boyfriend who was a date for an arranged marriage.
 Hanna Stein as Shira Liedman, a popular, shallow student and Ben's girlfriend in season 1.
 Angela Kinsey as Vivian Gross, Ben's mother (season 1).
 Michael Badalucco as Howard Gross, Ben's father (seasons 1, 3).
 Donna Pieroni as Patty, Ben's housekeeper (season 1, 3).
 Dana G. Vaughns as Marcus Jones, Paxton's friend.
 Aitana Rinab as Zoe Maytag, Shira's friend.
 Tyler Alvarez as Malcolm Stone, a former Disney actor and an elementary school friend who transfers to Sherman Oaks (season 2).
 Utkarsh Ambudkar as Mr. Manish Kulkarni, an English teacher who is friends with Devi and also coaches the girls' soccer team.
 P. J. Byrne as Evan Safstrom, a head research assistant at Caltech (season 2).
 John Mawson as Dr. Elgin Peters, Nobel prize-winning scientist at Caltech (season 2).
 Common as Dr. Chris Jackson, a dermatologist who works with Nalini and has an interest for Nalini (season 2).
 Tohoru Masamune as Kevin Hall-Yoshida, Paxton's father (season 2, 3).
 Kelly Sullivan as June Hall-Yoshida, Paxton’s mother (season 2, 3).
 Ranjita Chakravarty as Nirmala Vishwakumar, Mohan's mother, Nalini's mother-in-law and Devi's paternal grandmother (season 2-present).
 Clyde Kusatsu as Ted Yoshida, Paxton's paternal grandfather (season 2).
 Helen Hong as Sharon Wong, Eleanor's stepmother (season 2).
 Sarayu Blue as Rhyah, Nalini's new Indian friend and mother to Des (season 3).
 Anirudh Pisharody as Nirdesh "Des", an Indian student who goes to an elite private school; Rhyah's son and briefly Devi's boyfriend (season 3).
 Jeff Garlin as Len, a sweet man who fixes a mean sandwhich.

Guest
 Markus Jorgensen as Boris Koslov, a Russian exchange student.
 Gilberto Ortiz as Alex Gomez, a young man interested in Fabiola.
 Chelly as Parvesh, Vishwakumar family friend.
 Peter James Smith as Mr. Chan, the orchestra teacher.
 Kikéy Castillo as Christina Harrison, Trent's mother.
 Atticus Shaffer as a young man who participates in model UN as Russia.
 Iqbal Theba as Aravind, Mohan's brother and Devi's Paternal Uncle.
 Mark Collier as Andy, Vishwakumars' neighbor.
 Adriyah Marie Young as Carley, Shira's friend.
 Andy Samberg as himself, the narrator for Ben Gross's thoughts in two episodes.
 Pragathi Guruprasad as Preethi's sister.
Anjul Nigam as Raj, a pandit at the Ganesh Puja celebration.
 Gigi Hadid as herself, the narrator for Paxton Hall-Yoshida's thoughts in one episode.
 Pooja Kumar as Noor, Aneesa's mother.
 Andrew Tinpo Lee as Paul Wong, Eleanor's father.
 Sunit Gupta as Karthik, Nalini's father, and Devi's maternal grandfather.
 K.T. Thangavelu as Charu, Nalini's mother, and Devi's maternal grandmother.
 Deacon Philippe as Parker.

Production 
On March 20, 2019, it was reported that Netflix had given a 10-episode series order to the then-untitled "semi-autobiographical comedy".

In an interview with The New York Times, Kaling said that Netflix was open to have a show "set in the ’80s or the ’90s, but I’d seen that done so well with shows like Fresh Off the Boat and Everybody Hates Chris. I really wanted to speak to kids now". The show's name, Never Have I Ever, was created by co-creator Lang Fisher, and Kaling said it was chosen because "[Devi's] ego is so caught up in the things she hasn’t done yet, hasn’t been exposed to yet. And that felt really kind of natural to her personality". Speaking to The Hindu, Kaling said the show was "definitely not based on my childhood but it is in the spirit of my childhood", adding "I was a shy nerd, but did not have the confidence Devi has".

Casting 
In July 2019, Maitreyi Ramakrishnan was reported to be cast as Devi after Mindy Kaling put out an open casting call and received over 15,000 responses. John McEnroe was offered the role of narrating the series after Kaling had approached him during an Oscar party hosted by Vanity Fair.

All the actors met at the first table read and no "chemistry reads" were done between characters.

Filming
Principal photography of season 1 began on July 14, 2019, with production wrapping up on October 31, 2019. Season 2 commenced on November 10, 2020, at the Universal Studios in Los Angeles and wrapped at the end of March 2021. Season 3 began filming on November 29, 2021, and wrapped on March 1, 2022. The fourth and final season wrapped filming in early August 2022.

Episodes

Season 1 (2020)

Season 2 (2021)

Season 3 (2022)

Reception

Critical response 

On Rotten Tomatoes, the first season holds an approval rating of 95% based on 61 reviews, with an average rating of 7.80/10; the second season holds a 94% based on 35 reviews and an average rating of 8.30/10; and the third season has a rating of 91% and an average rating of 8.50/10 based on 22 reviews. The website's critical consensus for the first season reads, "Never Have I Ever fresh take on the coming-of-age comedy is hilariously honest, sweetly smart, and likely to have viewers falling head over heels for charming newcomer Maitreyi Ramakrishnan" while the website's critical consensus for the second season reads, "Though Never Have I Ever's sophomore season at times suffers from tonal commitment issues, nuanced writing and an utterly charming cast make it easy to forgive and enjoy." On Metacritic, it has a weighted average score of 81 out of 100 based on 32 critics, indicating "universal acclaim".

Rohan Naahar from The Hindustan Times described the show as "something like Fresh Off the Boat, but it does a much better job at balancing the comedy and the drama", along with praising how Devi, Nalini, and Kamala were "written with depth". Naahar also praised how Devi's "repulsive [behavior] makes her a real person". Petrana Radulovic from Polygon stated that it was "easy to invest in [the] characters because they feel like real teenagers with real specificities", also praising the series for "highlighting little details in the Indian-American, first-generation immigrant, and Gen-Z high-school experiences", along with praising the "specific humor, which then fold into the plot and turn from just funny bits into meaningful commentary". In contrast to most other critics, Pallabi Dey Purkayastha from The Times Of India described the show as going "overboard with stereotyping", mentioning "clichés circling the Indian diaspora that would have held some relevance if this were the 80s or 90s", although still rating the series 3.5 out of 5 stars and describing John McEnroe's narration as "hilarious".

Reviewing the second season, Nahaar from The Hindustan Times described the show as being "clearly the creation of someone who is separated by a palpable generational distance from their culture. But then again, this conflict is what Devi, and perhaps Kaling herself, are hounded by". Joshua Rivera from Polygon described the second season as "continuing to nail a tricky balance between heartfelt realism and Disney Channel absurdism". Divya Kala Bhanavi, writing for The Hindu, said the season "forces us to look at ourselves and acknowledge how much, during our teens, we were more problematic than we like to admit", along with praising how the season "tells the story of different shades of brown feminism across generations. Nalini’s notions of what she must do for her family clash with that of her mother’s, while Devi’s beliefs in expressing her independence varies to those of Kamala". Candice Frederick from TV Guide felt it was "increasingly clear" that the narrator John McEnroe was "merely reciting lines with little authenticity". Inkoo Kang from The Washington Post felt the season was "crowded with characters", with conflicts that made it feel "bloated and weighed down".

Reviewing the third season, Meera Navlakha from Mashable criticized it for the "sheer number of relationships examined", stating that it meant some were "given less brevity and depth" and that plotlines were "often discarded too quickly". However, Navlakha also praised the season for "the idea of "being Indian" [being] explored in a nuanced storyline" and for "some fantastic one-liners and scenarios that blend culture in a way that's rarely seen on screen", along with noting a "thematic shift in the series, focusing more on identity, self-esteem, and change". Sonikka Loganathan from The Hindu praised Devi's character development, while adding that there were "arguably too many subplots afoot".

Jewish representation 
Some critics have described the depiction of the Jewish character Ben Gross as being anti-Semitic. Meena Venkataramanan from Harvard Political Review wrote, "The show’s anti-Semitism is exacerbated by [Devi's] academic rival's characterization as a Jewish caricature and the jokes his religion and wealth generate at his expense". Mira Fox from The Forward says "[Ben Gross is] a wildly rich nerdy suck-up, with an absent, workaholic Hollywood lawyer for a dad and negligent Jewish-Buddhist type for a mom. He falsely cries anti-Semitism when his classmates reject his (objectively terrible) idea for a class project. And he’s dating a painfully stereotypical Jewish American Princess named Shira, who he doesn’t even like, in order to raise his own social clout; Shira, he tells Devi, is dating him for his money." By contrast, most of the supporting characters, such as Fabiola or Paxton, have been written to defy their ethnic stereotypes.

Evan Greenberg, writing for the feminist Jewish culture site Hey Alma, lodged similar complaints about Gross's character being "rooted in lazy stereotypes". Greenberg highlights Kaling's response to possible jokes being sensitive in an NPR interview, "...because I think the lead is what people would call, like, a marginalized person, like a young Indian American girl, I think we’re able to get away with stuff because of a certain powerlessness that that demographic has in society [laughter], honestly," as problematic for a "young, impressionable audience."

In contrast, writer for Jewish parenting site Kveller, Lior Zaltman, praised the show, saying that Gross's character, set up as a typical high-achieving assimilated Jew, breaks into surprising depth and compares Devi's assimilation struggle between her cultural heritage and wanting to be a "cool American teen" to being raised Jewish in a secularized American education.

Audience viewership 
At their Q2 report meeting in July 2020, Netflix reported the series had been viewed by 40 million households globally since its release.

Notes

References

External links
 
 

2020 American television series debuts
2020s American comedy-drama television series
2020s American high school television series
2020s American teen drama television series
Coming-of-age television shows
English-language Netflix original programming
Indian-American television
Television series about teenagers
Television series by 3 Arts Entertainment
Television series by Universal Television
Television shows filmed in Los Angeles
Television shows set in Los Angeles
Television series created by Mindy Kaling
Indian-American culture in California